Stade Marchand is a multi-use stadium in Brazzaville, Republic of the Congo.  It is used for football matches and serves as the home of Diables Noirs of the Congo Premier League. It has a capacity of 5,000 people.

Football venues in the Republic of the Congo
Sports venues in the Republic of the Congo
Buildings and structures in Brazzaville
Sport in Brazzaville